The 1980 Ohio Bobcats football team was an American football team that represented Ohio University in the Mid-American Conference (MAC) during the 1980 NCAA Division I-A football season. In their second season under head coach Brian Burke, the Bobcats compiled a 6–5 record (5–4 against MAC opponents), finished in a tie for fifth place in the MAC, and outscored all opponents by a combined total of 222 to 196.  They played their home games in Peden Stadium in Athens, Ohio.

Schedule

References

Ohio
Ohio Bobcats football seasons
Ohio Bobcats football